AMC-10 (formerly GE-10) is an American geostationary communications satellite that was launched by an Atlas-IIAS launch vehicle at 23:46:02 UTC on 5 February 2004. The  satellite will provide high-definition digital video channels to North America through its 24 C-band transponders, over 135° West longitude. It will replace the current GE Satcom C-4 satellite after a few months of tests.

References 

Communications satellites
Satellites using the A2100 bus
Spacecraft launched in 2004